Lethe satyavati, the pallid forester, is a species of Satyrinae butterfly found in the  Indomalayan realm where it is  endemic to Assam

References

satyavati
Butterflies of Asia